The 2016 NCHC Tournament was the third tournament in league history. It was played between March 11 and March 19, 2016. Quarterfinal games were played at home team campus sites, while the final four games were played at the Target Center in Minneapolis, Minnesota. By winning the tournament, St. Cloud State received the NCHC's automatic bid to the 2016 NCAA Division I Men's Ice Hockey Tournament.

Format
The first round of the postseason tournament features a best-of-three games format. All eight conference teams participate in the tournament. Teams are seeded No. 1 through No. 8 according to their final conference standing, with a tiebreaker system used to seed teams with an identical number of points accumulated. The top four seeded teams each earn home ice and host one of the lower seeded teams.

The winners of the first round series advance to the Target Center for the NCHC Frozen Faceoff. The Frozen Faceoff uses a single-elimination format. Teams are re-seeded No. 1 through No. 4 according to the final regular season conference standings.

Conference standings
Note: GP = Games played; W = Wins; L = Losses; T = Ties; PTS = Points; GF = Goals For; GA = Goals Against

Bracket
Teams are reseeded after the first round

* denotes overtime periods

Results
All times are local.

Quarterfinals

(1) North Dakota vs. (8) Colorado College

(2) St. Cloud State vs. (7) Western Michigan

(3) Denver vs. (6) Nebraska-Omaha

(4) Minnesota–Duluth vs. (5) Miami

Semifinals

(1) North Dakota vs. (4) Minnesota–Duluth

(2) St. Cloud State vs. (3) Denver

Third place

(1) North Dakota vs. (3) Denver

Championship

(2) St. Cloud State vs. (4) Minnesota–Duluth

Tournament awards

Frozen Faceoff All-Tournament Team
F Mikey Eyssimont* (St. Cloud State)
F Dominic Toninato (Minnesota-Duluth)
F Nick Schmaltz (North Dakota)
D Ethan Prow (St. Cloud State)
D Willie Raskob (Minnesota-Duluth)
G Charlie Lindgren (St. Cloud State)
* Most Valuable Player(s)

References

NCHC Men's Ice Hockey Tournament
2016
Ice hockey in Minnesota
College sports in Minnesota
2016 in sports in Minnesota
March 2016 sports events in the United States